Scissors is a 1991 American psychological thriller film directed by Frank De Felitta and starring Sharon Stone, Ronny Cox, and Steve Railsback.

The plot centers on the life of Angela Anderson (Sharon Stone), a sexually repressed woman who becomes trapped in a mysterious apartment.

Plot
Angela Anderson (Sharon Stone) buys a pair of large scissors from a hardware shop. On her way home, she is attacked in the elevator of her apartment block by a red-bearded man, whom she stabs him with the scissors in self-defense. Immediately after the attack Angela is found by twin brothers (Steve Railsback) who live next door to her. The first brother Alex is the star of a successful soap opera, whereas the other, Cole, is an artist and wheelchair user. An attraction develops between Angela and Alex, which is constantly restrained by Angela's sexual repression. Hypnotherapy sessions with her psychiatrist Dr. Stephan Carter (Ronny Cox) reveal a red-bearded man named Billy in Angela's past, a startling coincidence to her recent attack.

Following her attack in the elevator, the increasing attention from Alex, and the fear of Cole she develops, Angela's sheltered world starts to fall apart. After another encounter with her red-bearded attacker, and harassment from Cole, Angela finds herself lured with the prospect of a job to a large and mysterious apartment where she finds herself trapped.

In the master bedroom, Angela finds the body of her red-bearded attacker, who has been murdered with the same pair of scissors she bought earlier. The only other living thing in the apartment with her is a caged raven, who caws repeatedly that Angela killed him. As Angela explores the apartment, she finds it is full of exhibits relating to her own psychology, it is clear at this point that someone wants to drive Angela into insanity.

Meanwhile, Alex has discovered that Angie is missing and while trying to discover her whereabouts, his brother Cole suddenly stands up from his wheelchair, attacks Alex, and then mysteriously leaves.

After many failed escape attempts Angela takes the raven from its cage, ties a message to its leg and, using the blood-stained scissors to remove a vent cover, releases the raven into an air vent. Angela wakes up the following morning to find that the body of her attacker has been moved to the dining room, and the mutilated corpse of the raven sits on a plate before it. The sight of this causes Angela to collapse in shock where she experiences a childhood flashback. In the flashback, her red-bearded stepfather Billy is murdered by her mother with a pair of scissors before her eyes - the horror being the root of her repression.

The next day the apartment is visited by Dr. Carter's wife, who is having an affair with the owner. She arrives to find her husband waiting for her, disguised in a red beard, revealing that he was Angela's attacker. He reveals to his wife that when he learned of the affair, he murdered her lover with a pair of scissors and had set Angela up to take the fall by luring her to the apartment, and exploiting what he had discovered about her past during hypnotherapy sessions. Carter convinces his horrified but politically ambitious wife to go along with the frame, and they set out to find the scissors used in the murder, since they may be used as evidence against him. While wandering in a trance-like state, Angela ventures through the main door (carelessly left open by Carter), closing it behind her and trapping Carter and his wife inside.  Dr. Carter attempts to lure Angela back by posing as Billy, to no avail.

Outside Angela is rescued by Alex, who had tracked her to the apartment's address. A trapped Carter bangs the scissors furiously against the glass of the window, as a liberated Angela looks back with a vengeful smile.

Cast
 Sharon Stone as Angela Anderson
Kelly Noonan as Young Angela Anderson
 Steve Railsback as Alex and Cole Morgan
 Ronny Cox as Dr. Stephan Carter
 Michelle Phillips as Ann Carter
 Vicki Frederick as Nancy
 Leonard Rogel as Red Beard
 Carl Ciarfalio as Attacker
 Howie Guma as Clerk
 Larry Moss as Kramer
 Paul Austin Kelly as Folger
 Albert Popwell as Officer
 Jim Shankman as Bob, The Clerk
 Jesse Garcia as Counterman
 Hal Riddle as Dog Walker
 Laura Ann Caufield as Soap Opera Actress
 George Fisher as The Attacker
 Ivy Jones as Mother
 Will Leskin as Billy

References

External links
 
 

1991 films
1991 horror films
1990s mystery thriller films
American mystery thriller films
American psychological horror films
American psychological thriller films
Films set in apartment buildings
1991 directorial debut films
Films directed by Frank De Felitta
Films about sexual repression
1990s English-language films
1990s American films